Champions Trophy is the name of a number of different trophies in different sports:

 Hockey Champions Trophy, an international field hockey tournament 
 ICC Champions Trophy, a cricket tournament 
 Men's Asian Champions Trophy, a men's Asian field hockey tournament
 Women's Asian Champions Trophy, a women's Asian field hockey tournament

See also 
 CT (disambiguation)